Best Of is a greatest hits album by the Swedish group The Cardigans, released in Europe in January 2008. It contains twenty-one singles and album tracks. There is also a double-CD version with rare tracks and B-sides. Both versions of the album contain no new songs, though some tracks had previously been released only in the UK or Japan.

It was released in Canada in May 2008 with a different track listing, containing only sixteen tracks.

Track listing

CD 1
 "Rise and Shine"
 "Sick & Tired"
 "After All..."
 "Carnival"
 "Daddy's Car"
 "Lovefool"
 "Been It"
 "Losers"
 "War"
 "My Favourite Game"
 "Erase/Rewind"
 "Hanging Around"
 "Higher"
 "For What It's Worth"
 "You're the Storm"
 "Live and Learn"
 "Communication"
 "I Need Some Fine Wine and You, You Need to Be Nicer"
 "Don't Blame Your Daughter (Diamonds)"
 "Godspell"
 "Bonus Track"
 "Burning Down the House" (duet with Tom Jones)

CD 2
 "Pooh Song"
 "After All..." (Demo '93)
 "I Figured Out" (Demo '93)
 "Laika"
 "Plain Parade"
 "Emmerdale"
 "Carnival" (Puck Version)
 "Happy Meal 1"
 "Nasty Sunny Beam"
 "Blah Blah Blah"
 "Losers" (First Try)
 "Country Hell"
 "Lovefool" (Puck Version)
 "War" (First Try)
 "Deuce"
 "The Road"
 "Hold Me" (Mini Version)
 "Hold Me"
 "If There Is a Chance"
 "For the Boys"
 "(If You Were) Less Like Me"
 "Slowdown Town"
 "Give Me Your Eyes"
 "Slow"

Canadian edition
 "Lovefool"
 "Been It"
 "Carnival"
 "Rise & Shine"
 "Sick & Tired"
 "My Favourite Game"
 "Erase/Rewind"
 "Hanging Around"
 "For What It's Worth"
 "You're the Storm"
 "Live and Learn"
 "Communication"
 "I Need Some Fine Wine and You, You Need to Be Nicer"
 "Don't Blame Your Daughter (Diamonds)"
 "Burning Down the House" (duet with Tom Jones)
 "Godspell"

Charts

Release history

References

2008 greatest hits albums
The Cardigans albums